Srzeniawa is a Polish coat of arms. It was used by several szlachta families in the times of the Kingdom of Poland and the Polish–Lithuanian Commonwealth.

History

Blazon

Notable bearers

Notable bearers of this coat of arms include:

 House of Kmita
 Piotr Kmita Sobieński
 Piotr Kmita z Wiśnicza
 Mikołaj Kurowski - catholic hierarch, Great Chancellor of the Crown of Poland, Primate of Poland
 Wacław Potocki
 Elżbieta Sieniawska
 Achatius de Przylek Przylecki
 Stanisław Stadnicki
 Wacław Potocki
 House of Lubomirski (Srzeniwa without Cross)

Related coat of arms 
 Drużyna coat of arms

Gallery

See also
 Polish heraldry
 Heraldic family
 List of Polish nobility coats of arms

Bibliography
 Tadeusz Gajl: Herbarz polski od średniowiecza do XX wieku : ponad 4500 herbów szlacheckich 37 tysięcy nazwisk 55 tysięcy rodów. L&L, 2007, s. 406-539. .
 Kasper Niesiecki, Herbarz, VIII, 468-469
 Andrzej Kulikowski: Wielki herbarz rodów polskich. Warszawa: Świat Książki, 2005, s. 298-300. .

External links
  Szreniawa Coat of Arms and bearers. 
  
 Family of Pisarski | coat of arms Sreniawa 

Srzeniawa